Mikhaylovka is a rural locality (a settlement) in Verkh-Allaksky Selsoviet, Kamensky District, Altai Krai, Russia. The population was 79 as of 2013. There are 2 streets.

Geography 
Mikhaylovka is located 38 km northeast of Kamen-na-Obi (the district's administrative centre) by road. Verkh-Allak is the nearest rural locality.

References 

Rural localities in Kamensky District, Altai Krai